Anzac Parade, a significant road and thoroughfare in the Australian capital Canberra, is used for ceremonial occasions and is the site of many major military memorials.

Named in honour of the Australian and New Zealand Army Corps (ANZAC) of World War I, Anzac Parade joins Gallipoli Reach of Lake Burley Griffin in the south and the Australian War Memorial to the north. As the main axis between Parliament House and Mount Ainslie, it bisects Constitution Avenue, which forms one side of the Parliamentary Triangle between Civic and Russell Hill.

The Parade is flanked by Victorian blue gum eucalyptus trees on gently sloping banks either side of the three-lane, one-way roads centred by a wide parade ground topped with granulated rock (similar to scoria), with planted boxes of a low bush called Hebe. The eucalypts are Australian; and the hebe comes from New Zealand. The Parade is also flanked by the streets of Anzac Park West and Anzac Park East on either side of Anzac Park.

On Anzac Day (25 April) and other ceremonial occasions, the Parade and adjoining streets may be blocked off to provide a parade route for formed groups of armed services personnel and veterans to proceed either along the central parade ground or the flanking roads. Removable concrete kerbs to facilitate marching along the central parade route are at the cross streets of Parkes Way, Constitution Avenue, Currong Street/Blamey Crescent, and Limestone Avenue/Fairbairn Avenue.

Memorial interpretation

In the manner of interpretation of museum displays, the memorials are accompanied by several forms of signage to assist the passer-by. Each memorial has various plaques or foundation stones that were laid at the time of unveiling. Additionally, interpretative signage in a common format has been provided by the Government of Australia adjacent to each memorial that gives succinct information about the nature and/or the site of the people or group or events leading to the establishment of the memorial.

Situation and history
Anzac Parade is situated on the main axis between Parliament House and Mount Ainslie. It bisects Constitution Avenue, which forms one side of the Parliamentary Triangle between Civic and Russell Hill.

The Parade separates the residential suburbs of Campbell and Reid. The naming is significant:
Robert Campbell, Sydney's first merchant, received a grant of land on the Limestone Plains as compensation for the loss of one of his ships on government charter. In 1825 he built a homestead, naming it Duntroon after the Campbell castle in Argyllshire, Scotland. Duntroon House is now part of the Royal Military College, Duntroon.
The Right Honourable Sir George Houston Reid (1845–1918) was Australia's fourth Prime Minister who formed a Government in August 1904 and held office until July 1905. A Federalist, and one of the founders of the Australian Constitution, he entered the Australian House of Representatives after having been Premier of New South Wales from 1894 to 1898.

At the corner of Anzac Parade and Constitution Avenue is the historic St John the Baptist Anglican Church, consecrated by the Bishop of Australia, William Broughton, on 12 March 1845, some 80 years before the site of the national capital was decided. Fortuitously, the alignment of the church was such that it seems to have been designed to fit the alignment of the adjoining roads, ordained in the plans by Walter Burley Griffin.

Lighting
The original lighting was designed to be a symbolic "honour guard" and was opened by then Prime Minister, Robert Menzies, on Anzac Day 25 April 1965.
The street lighting was updated and officially opened on 26 March 2001 by then Prime Minister of Australia, John Howard. The design is intended to be efficient, and to reduce energy consumption and thus air pollution while also reducing skyglow/light pollution.

Heritage listing
On Anzac Day 25 April 2006 Federal Environment and Heritage Minister Ian Campbell announced that Anzac Parade along with the Australian War Memorial would be added to the National Heritage List.

See also

References

External links 

 Anzac Parade Walk / National Capital Authority
 Collection of slides illustrating the design, construction and landscaping of Lake Burley Griffin and adjacent national areas of Canberra, ca. 1909–1981 / Richard Clough & Australian Overseas Information Service
 Collection of photographs of Anzac Parade, Canberra – 2002 / Damian McDonald

Streets in Canberra
World War I memorials in Australia
Military memorials in Canberra
ANZAC (Australia)